LAPACK++, the Linear Algebra PACKage in C++, is a computer software library of algorithms for numerical linear algebra that solves systems of linear equations and eigenvalue problems.

It supports various matrix classes for vectors, non-symmetric matrices, SPD matrices, symmetric matrices, banded, triangular, and tridiagonal matrices. However, it does not include all of the capabilities of original LAPACK library.

History
The original LAPACK++ (up to v1.1a) was written by R. Pozo et al. at the University of Tennessee and Oak Ridge National Laboratory.
In 2000, R. Pozo et al. left the project, with the projects' web page stating LAPACK++ would be superseded by the Template Numerical Toolkit (TNT).

The current LAPACK++ (versions 1.9 onwards) started off as a fork from the original LAPACK++. There are extensive fixes and changes, such as more wrapper functions for LAPACK and BLAS routines.

See also
 List of numerical analysis software
 List of numerical libraries

External links
 old LAPACK++ Homepage  (version 1.1a)
 new LAPACK++ Homepage (versions 1.9 onwards)

C++ numerical libraries